blue cathedral is an orchestral composition by the American composer Jennifer Higdon.  The work was commissioned by the Curtis Institute of Music in 1999 to commemorate the conservatory's 75th anniversary.  It was first performed in 2000 by the Curtis Institute of Music Symphony Orchestra.  The piece is dedicated to the memory of Higdon's brother and is one of the composer's most performed works.

Composition
blue cathedral has a duration of roughly 13 minutes and is composed in a single movement.

Background
The piece was written in memory of Higdon's younger brother, Andrew Blue Higdon, who died of skin cancer in June 1998.  The composer wrote in the score program note:
Higdon later described the process of composing blue cathedral as "the most cathartic thing [she] could have done."

Instrumentation
The work is scored for an orchestra comprising two flutes (2nd doubling piccolo), oboe, cor anglais, two clarinets, two bassoons, four horns, three trumpets, three trombones, tuba, harp, piano, celesta, timpani, three percussionists, and strings.

Reception
blue cathedral has received a positive response from critics.  Tim Smith of The Baltimore Sun lauded, "The music seems to emit and reflect light as it moves from stillness to exuberance and back again, tapering off ethereally. If you didn't know the personal story behind it, the music could still touch your heart; when you do know that story, it can touch your soul."  David Patrick Stearns of The Philadelphia Inquirer also praised the piece, writing:
Travis Rivers of The Spokesman-Review similarly remarked:

Recording
A recording of blue cathedral, performed by Robert Spano and the Atlanta Symphony Orchestra, was released in 2003 through Telarc.  The disk also featured Christopher Theofanidis's Rainbow Body, Samuel Barber's Symphony in One Movement, and Aaron Copland's Appalachian Spring.

See also
List of compositions by Jennifer Higdon

References

Compositions by Jennifer Higdon
1999 compositions
Compositions for symphony orchestra
Music dedicated to family or friends
Funerary and memorial compositions
Music commissioned by the Curtis Institute of Music